Promega Corporation  is a Madison, Wisconsinbased manufacturer of  enzymes and other products for biotechnology and molecular biology with a portfolio covering the fields of genomics, protein analysis and expression, cellular analysis, drug discovery and genetic identity.

History 
Promega Corporation was founded by  Bill Linton in 1978 to provide restriction enzymes for biotechnology. The company now offers more than 4,000 life science products used by scientists, researchers and life science and pharmaceutical companies. Promega has 1,601 employees. Revenue is approaching $450 million (USD) in 2019.

The privately held company has branch offices in 16 countries and more than 50 global distributors serving 100 countries. Promega Corporation also established the first biotechnology joint venture in China (Sino-American Biotechnology Co. in 1985).

The company has developed an on-site stocking system, which uses radio frequency identification (RFID) linked to the Internet to track and manage remote inventory. This resulted in the spin-off company Terso Solutions that specializes in the design and manufacturing of small RFID storage units.

In February 2020, Foreign Policy reported that Promega had sold equipment to the Xinjiang Production and Construction Corps. In 2021, The New York Times reported that, despite bans, Promega equipment continued to be sold to police in Xinjiang.

Product areas and technologies

Genomics

The company's portfolio began with products for genomics researchers and now includes cloning systems, luciferase reporters, and amplification products as well as the original restriction and modifying enzymes. The  portfolio of amplification products includes the GoTaq family of polymerases, buffers and the Plexor quantitative PCR system.

Genetic identity and forensics

The company is one of two main suppliers of systems for genetic identification based on DNA analysis using short tandem repeats (STRs).  Promega was the first company to provide kits for STR analysis of single loci. Along with Applied Biosystems, Promega participated with the FBI and other crime labs in validating STR loci that would eventually be selected as the core loci for the Combined DNA Index System (CODIS), used for forensic DNA testing in North America.

The Promega PowerPlex STR systems were the first commercially available systems for STR analysis that contained all of the CODIS loci.

Proteomics
Promega was an early supplier in the cell-free protein synthesis field and is continuing to develop its portfolio in this area.

Cellular analysis and drug discovery

Promega offers a range of products for cell biology and drug discovery, many of which are built upon bioluminescence technology. Assays for drug discovery are used globally and include biochemical and cell-based assays. In 2010, Promega launched a custom assay services business for biologics and small molecule drug development.

Integrated platforms

The company also sells their own Maxwell RSC and Maxwell RSC 48 Systems, bench-top automated purification systems for low and middle throughput research and diagnostic laboratories.

The Y-Chromosome Deletion Detection System from Promega also carries the CE Mark for use as an in vitro diagnostic device in the European Union.

Footnotes

External links
 

Companies based in Wisconsin
Research support companies
1978 establishments in Wisconsin
Biotechnology companies established in 1978
American companies established in 1978